The women's 1000 meter at the 2014 KNSB Dutch Single Distance Championships took place in Heerenveen at the Thialf ice skating rink on Sunday 27 October 2013. Although this tournament was held in 2013, it was part of the speed skating season 2013–2014.

There were 24 participants.

Title holder was Marrit Leenstra.

Statistics

Result

Draw

Source:

References 

Single Distance Championships
2014 Single Distance
World